Domibacillus indicus is a Gram-positive, aerobic, rod-shaped and non-motile bacterium from the genus of Domibacillus which has been isolated from marine sediments from Lakshadweep in India.

References

External links
Type strain of Domibacillus indicus at BacDive -  the Bacterial Diversity Metadatabase

Bacillaceae
Bacteria described in 2014